Ozyptila furcula is a crab spider species found in Spain, France and the Balearic Islands.

References

External links 

furcula
Spiders of Europe
Spiders described in 1882